Obachi (尾駮) was a launch site for meteorological rockets and rockoons in Rokkasho, Aomori, Japan.

External links 
Astronautix.com - Obachi

Geography of Hokkaido